Samarka is a rural locality (a selo) and the administrative center of Samarsky Selsoviet, Rubtsovsky District, Altai Krai, Russia. The population was 887 as of 2013. There are 9 streets.

Geography 
Samarka is located 18 km south of Rubtsovsk (the district's administrative centre) by road. Polovinkino is the nearest rural locality.

References 

Rural localities in Rubtsovsky District